The Indian state of Maharashtra has a bicameral legislature, comprising two houses. The lower house, known as the Legislative Assembly ("Vidhan Sabha" in Marathi), is directly elected by the people and is the more powerful of the two houses. The upper house, known as the Legislative Council ("Vidhan Parishad" in Marathi) is elected indirectly by several specially designated electorates.

The Legislative Assembly has a tenure of five years, at most, and it may be dissolved before time in case the government falls for lack of majority, and nobody else can cobble up a majority. The Assembly has a strength of 288 seats, each seat being a geographical constituency.

Timeline
The term of the Legislative Assembly of Maharashtra was due to expire on 8 November 2014. By virtue of its powers, duties and functions under Article 324 read with Article 172(1) of the Constitution of India and Section 15 of Representation of the People Act, 1951, the Election Commission of India is required to hold elections to constitute the new Legislative Assembly in the State of Maharashtra during a window of time which is: between six months before and six months after the date of expiry. Elections are almost invariably held before the expiry of the term, rather than afterwards.

The Model Code of Conduct comes into effect the day that the election commission announces the schedule of elections. This happened on 12 September 2014. The required Gazette Notification was issued on 20 September 2014. The legislative assembly election was held on 15 October 2014, in a single phase, to select the 288 members of the Maharashtra Legislative Assembly in India. The result was announced on 19 October, with the BJP getting a plurality. The term of the current 13th Legislative Assembly is to end on November 9, 2019, as the first meeting of the new house was held on November 10, 2014.

Background 
After the landslide victory of BJP in 2014 Indian general election under the leadership of Narendra Modi , BJP won majority seats in the state and formed government with Shivsena by reviving there grand old alliance.
Congress-NCP alliance was not able to attain majority due to decreasing popularity of UPA government and massive corruption. However Nationalist Congress Party offered outside support to BJP for forming government but latter rejected

Alliances
Following the NCP-INC alliance's performance in the 2014 Indian general election, the NCP demanded 144 seats to contest and a rotation of the Chief Minister's post between parties. Both parties held negotiations but failed to reach a conclusion. The INC declared its list of candidates for 118 seats on 25 September without consulting the NCP. Thus, the NCP unilaterally severed its 15-year-old alliance with the INC. The INC later reached out to the Samajwadi Party (SP) to form an alliance.

The Shiv Sena and Bharatiya Janta Party (BJP) were alliance partners for 25-years - including several smaller parties, such as Republican Party of India (Athavale), Swabhimani Shetkari Sanghatna, Rashtriya Samaj Paksha, were also a part. After the general election, the BJP demanded additional seats to contest; initially they requested 144 seats but later reduced their demand to 130 seats. The Shiv Sena offered 119 seats to the BJP and 18 seats to four other allies, keeping 151 to contest itself. After several rounds of negotiations, the parties did not reach a conclusion. Thus the Shiv Sena - BJP alliance ended on the 25 September as well after 25 years of togetherness.

Parties
National Democratic Alliance
Bharatiya Janata Party 
Republican Party of India (Athavale) 
Swabhimani Paksha 
Rashtriya Samaj Paksha 
Shiv Sangram
Shiv Sena
Indian National Congress
Nationalist Congress Party
Maharashtra Navnirman Sena
Peasants and Workers Party of India
Bahujan Vikas Aaghadi
Samajwadi Party
Bahujan Mukti Party
Bharipa Bahujan Mahasangh
Bahujan Samaj Party
All India Majlis-e-Ittehadul Muslimeen
Communist Party of India (Marxist)
Jan Surajya Shakti (JSSP)
Republican Sena

Campaign

Indian National Congress
The incumbent Indian National Congress started its campaign on 1 September at Hutatma Chowk, Mumbai. Prithviraj Chavan, the incumbent Chief Minister led the campaign with Narayan Rane heading the Campaign Committee. The party's advertising campaign began on 20 September.

Nationalist Congress Party
The Nationalist Congress Party began its campaign in Kolhapur on 16 September with national party President Sharad Pawar, Deputy Chief Minister Ajit Pawar, Maharashtra party President Sunil Tatkare and MP from Kolhapur Dhananjay Mahadik attending the rally.

Bharatiya Janata Party
Prime Minister Narendra Modi spoke in South Mumbai's Mahalaxmi Racecourse after his return from the U.S. for the sixty-ninth session of the United Nations General Assembly.

Shiv Sena
Shiv Sena started its campaign at Mahalaxmi Racecourse in Mumbai on 27 September, where party leader Uddhav Thackeray addressed its supporters.

Election 
A total of 3255 candidates contested the election.voter turnout was 64%. Voter-verified paper audit trail (VVPAT) along with EVMs was used in 13 constituencies: Wardha, Amravati (2 pockets), Yavatmal, Chandrapur, Nashik (3 pockets), Aurangabad (3 pockets) and Ahmednagar (2 pockets).

List of Political Parties participated in 2014 Maharashtra Assembly Elections.

Surveys and polls

Exit polls

Results

Detailed Results

Region-wise break up

City Wise Results

Division-wise results

District-wise results

Results by constituency

Government formation
With the BJP having won a plurality, the NCP offered outside support to the BJP, according to Praful Patel. The NCP offer was read as putting the Shiv Sena under pressure by saying it gave the BJP "mega-clout" in negotiations with the Shiv Sena. Amit Shah did not turn down the offer saying that the party's parliamentary board, including Prime Minister Narendra Modi would discuss options. Other unnamed BJP members said the Shiv Sena was "a natural fit" with the party. Other unnamed BJP members said they expected the Shiv Sena to seek the post of deputy chief minister as well as more ministers in the national government. Unnamed Shiv Sena spokespeople told NDTV that, as potential kingmaker, Uddhav Thackeray would decide the next steps "in Maharashtra's best interest." Finally, BJP and Shiv Sena agreed to come together and form the government.

See also

 2014 elections in India

References

External links
 Assembly Election, Election Commission of India

State Assembly elections in Maharashtra
2010s in Maharashtra
2014 State Assembly elections in India
April 2014 events in India
2014 in Maharashtra